Jan Dobraczyński (Warsaw, 20 April 1910 – 5 March 1994, Warsaw) was a Polish writer, novelist, politician and Catholic publicist. In the Second Polish Republic between the two world wars, he was a supporter of the National Party and Catholic movements. During the 1939 Nazi–Soviet invasion of Poland, he was a soldier of the Polish Army and member of Armia Krajowa until the end of World War II. Dobraczyński participated in the Warsaw Uprising of 1944. After the war he supported the Polish communists. He was a member of parliament Sejms, as activist of the PAX Association and of the Patriotic Movement for National Rebirth from 1982 to 1985. He held the rank of general in the Polish military.

The Holocaust rescue
During World War II, as the head of the Division for Abandoned Children at the Warsaw municipal welfare department, Jan Dobraczynski helped Żegota activists with procuring forged documents and placed several hundred Jewish children in Catholic convents. He was imprisoned in Bergen-Belsen following the Warsaw Uprising.

In 1985 Dobraczyński was awarded the Cross of Virtuti Militari. In 1986 he published his memoir titled Tylko w jednym życiu (Of One Life Only). In 1993 he was bestowed the title of the Polish Righteous Among the Nations by Yad Vashem in Jerusalem.

Bibliography
 Jan Dobraczyński, Tylko w jednym życiu (Of One Life Only, memoir). Wspomnienia, 1986
 Aleksander Rogalski, Dobraczyński, 1986 (fr)
 Aleksander Rogalski, Jan Dobraczyński, 1981 (en)
 Jerzy Ziomek, Jana Dobraczyńskiego Księgi (bez) Wyjścia, in Wizerunki polskich pisarzy katolickich, 1963.
 Zygmunt Lichniak, Szkic do portretu Jana Dobraczyńskiego, 1962
 Jan Dobraczynski, "Najezdzcy" - Les Envahisseurs translated by Jean Nittman 1960

See also
Sprawy Narodu

Footnotes

1910 births
1994 deaths
Writers from Warsaw
People from Warsaw Governorate
Polish Roman Catholics
National Party (Poland) politicians
PAX Association members
Members of the Polish Sejm 1952–1956
Members of the Polish Sejm 1985–1989
Polish male writers
Polish nationalists
Polish People's Army generals
Polish people of the Polish–Soviet War
Home Army members
Bergen-Belsen concentration camp survivors
Warsaw Uprising insurgents
Polish Righteous Among the Nations
Catholic Righteous Among the Nations
Recipients of the Order of the Banner of Work
Recipients of the Order of the Builders of People's Poland
Recipients of the Virtuti Militari (1943–1989)
Żegota members